Verax IPMI in an open source Java library implementing IPMI protocol 2.0 over UDP. The library allows to probe devices over IPMI which has been adopted as a SNMP alternative for hardware management by many vendors. Library is compliant with the IPMI v2.0, revision 1.0 standard. Verax IPMI library is a native Java 1.6 implementation and no additional native libraries or drivers required.

Overview 
Library provides UDP session management (connect, disconnect, keep-alives, sliding window for messages and message sequence numbers) and supports any number of concurrent sessions. Library contains standard Intelligent Platform Management Interface encryption algorithms for authentication (RAKP-HMAC-SHA1), integrity (HMAC-SHA1-96) and confidentiality (AES-CBC-128), however additional algorithms can be provided. Library contains encoders and decoders for event log, sensor values and hardware information (FRU - Field Replaceable Unit). Library can be extended with additional, user-defined encoders.

The library supports encoders/decoders for IPMI version 1.5 messages, however session management is provided only for IPMI version 2.0.

License 
Verax IPMI Library for Java has been developed by Verax Systems and released under GPL v3 license.

See also 

 Java (programming language)
 IPMI protocol
 User datagram protocol

References 

Java platform software
Free computer libraries
Java development tools
Java (programming language) libraries